Cornehill is a historic home located at Parran, Calvert County, Maryland, United States. It is a five-bay-long two-story Georgian brick house laid in Flemish bond with a steeply pitched gable roof with an exterior chimney at each gable end.  One brick on the southwest corner contains the date 1786 and the initials "T.F." The initials purportedly refer to Thelbert Freeland, a member of an influential family in northeastern Calvert County. Outbuildings include slave quarters to the south of the house, and a tobacco barn with oak framing. During the majority of the 18th century, the Mackall family, large Calvert County landowners, held Cornehill, or "Cornhill."

Cornehill was listed on the National Register of Historic Places in 1972.

References

External links
, including undated photo, at Maryland Historical Trust

Houses on the National Register of Historic Places in Maryland
Houses in Calvert County, Maryland
Georgian architecture in Maryland
Houses completed in 1786
National Register of Historic Places in Calvert County, Maryland
Slave cabins and quarters in the United States